Nuis is a surname. Notable people with the surname include:

Aad Nuis (1933–2007), Dutch politician and political scientist
Kjeld Nuis (born 1989), Dutch speed skater

See also
NUI (disambiguation)